The Samsung Galaxy A30 is a mid-range Android smartphone developed, manufactured and marketed by Samsung Electronics. Running on the Android 9.0 "Pie" software, the A30 was unveiled on February 25, 2019 alongside the Samsung Galaxy A10 and Samsung Galaxy A50 at the Mobile World Congress. It was released a month later on March 2, 2019.

The A30 was praised by critics for its display and user interface. However, criticism was aimed at the phone's performance, battery life and camera.

Specifications

Hardware

Internal
The Galaxy A30 sports a 6.4-inch Super AMOLED Infinity-U screen display, along with an 84.9% screen-to-body ratio made out of the Gorilla Glass 3 material. Its dimensions measure 158.5 mm by 74.7 mm by 7.7 mm. Housing the Exynos 7904 chipset, the A30 also comes with 2 storage options, 32GB with 3GB of RAM and 64GB with 4GB of RAM that is expandable up to 512GB via microSD. It also contains a battery of 4000 mAh. The device has a dedicated slot for microSIM and a dual nano SIM slot which supports VoLTE.

Camera
The A30 comprises a dual-lens rear camera. The primary lens is 16 megapixels large (similar to the Samsung Galaxy A40), with a f/1.7 aperture and a face detection auto-focus feature. The second, ultra-wide camera lens is 5 megapixels large with an aperture size of f/2.2. Like the main lens at the back, the front camera of the phone also has a megapixel size of 16. The overall camera of the A30 offers support for LED flash and Full HD video recording as well. The Galaxy A30s also uses the 25MP rear camera module setup from Samsung Galaxy A50, while retaining same front camera as the Samsung Galaxy A30.

Processor

The Galaxy A30 is powered by Samsung’s Exynos 7904 Octa Core Processor has clocked upto 1.8Ghz. Big.Little Cores. ARM 2x 1.8Ghz Cortex A73 (performance) + 6x 1.6Ghz Cortex A53 (efficient). This chipset is powered by ARM Mali G71 MP2 Graphics clocked at 343Mhz & Boost upto 845Mhz, which supports Vulkan 1.1 based on bitfrost arch. Good For HD Graphic Games. However This Chipset performance is quite similar to Qualcomm Snapdragon 636. It’s Antutu scores upto 1,27,341. Sadly it’s an underclocked version of Exynos 7885, successor of Exynos 7870.

Software
The device uses the Android 9.0 "Pie" operating system, along with Samsung's One UI 1.0 user interface. The A30 also supports Bluetooth 5.0, Wi-fi connectivity and services such as the Bixby assistant, Samsung Pay and Samsung Health.

Reception

Both Deepak Rajawat of smartprix and Sanket Vijayasarathy of India Today praised the Galaxy A30's display, software and battery life, but criticized the phone's chipset due to performance issues and the "average" quality camera. Tom Bedford and Matt Swider of TechRadar also complimented the vibrant screen of the A30. However, the reviewers found the phone difficult to handle due to its large size. Writing a review for 91mobiles, Shekhar Thakhan praised the phone's AMOLED display, One UI interface and battery life as well. In contrast, the back of the phone was noted by the reviewer as a "fingerprint magnet".

See also
Samsung Galaxy
Samsung Galaxy A series

References

External links
 

Samsung Galaxy
Mobile phones introduced in 2019
Android (operating system) devices
Samsung mobile phones
Mobile phones with multiple rear cameras